The 2019–20 season was Forest Green Rovers's 131st year in existence and their third consecutive season in League Two. Along with competing in League Two, the club also participated in the FA Cup, EFL Cup and the EFL Trophy.

The season covers the period from 1 July 2019 to 30 June 2020.

Transfers

Transfers in

Loans in

Loans out

Transfers out

Pre-season
FGR announced pre-season friendlies against Weston-super-Mare, Yate Town, Salisbury, Bristol City and Bath City. However, two weeks before their opening match of pre-season was due to take place, Weston-super-mare – managed by former Forest Green academy coach Scott Bartlett – cancelled the fixture. This gap in the schedule was plugged with an away fixture against Swindon Supermarine, with Mark Cooper remarking that the replacement game would represent a "sterner test" for his Forest Green side.

Competitions

League Two

League table

Results summary

Results by matchday

Matches
On Thursday, 20 June 2019, the EFL League Two fixtures were revealed.

FA Cup

The first round draw was made on 21 October 2019. The second round draw was made live on 11 November from Chichester City's stadium, Oaklands Park.

EFL Cup

The first round draw was made on 20 June. The second round draw was made on 13 August 2019 following the conclusion of all but one first round matches.

EFL Trophy

On 9 July 2019, the pre-determined group stage draw was announced with Invited clubs to be drawn on 12 July 2019.

References

Forest Green Rovers F.C. seasons
Forest Green Rovers